Eni Malaj (born 14 July 1989 in Tirana, Albania) is an Albanian footballer who played as a goalkeeper for KF Tirana in the Albanian Superliga.

References

1989 births
Living people
Footballers from Tirana
Albanian footballers
Association football goalkeepers
KF Tirana players
FC Kamza players
KS Turbina Cërrik players
Kategoria e Parë players